Washington School is a private school in Greenville, Mississippi. Washington School offers pre-school, elementary, middle, and college preparatory education to Greenville and the surrounding areas. It was established as a segregation academy in response to Brown v. Board of Education.

History

The school was established as a segregation academy in response to the racial integration of the local public schools in 1969, with its first classes beginning in September 1970. In 1971, the school joined the Mississippi Private Schools Association, which had been created to help segregation academies organize school athletics and file legal documents to qualify for tax-deductible status with the IRS.

In its first year, Washington School had a total of 23 staff members and 323 students. Classes were originally held in the current elementary building. Enrollment in 2016 was 700 students with the average size of a graduating class being around 60 students. As of 2016, the school's students are 98% Caucasian, but Washington County is over 72% African American and the Greenville metro area is over 85% African American .

Notable alumni
Eden Brent, musician

References

External links

 School Web Site

Private elementary schools in Mississippi
Private middle schools in Mississippi
Private high schools in Mississippi
Schools in Washington County, Mississippi
Preparatory schools in Mississippi
Segregation academies in Mississippi
Educational institutions established in 1969